Oakenshaw can refer to four villages in England:

Oakenshaw, County Durham
Oakenshaw, Lancashire
Oakenshaw, West Yorkshire
Oakenshaw, Worcestershire

It may also refer to the geographically different

Oakenshaw railway station (disused), south east of Wakefield, West Yorkshire, England
Oakenshawe Historic District, Baltimore, Maryland, United States